Urs Güntensperger (born 24 November 1967) is a retired Swiss football striker.

Playing career
Güntensperger played his youth football with local amateur club FC Albisrieden and advanced to their first team during the 1987–88 season.

Güntensperger signed for FC Winterthur in 1988, who at this time played in the second tier of Swiss football, then in 2000 he signed for Lugano who played in the top tier. During this period Güntensperger had three appearances in the Swiss national U-21 team. Due to a car accident, during the 1991–92 season Güntensperger was injured and was not with a football club. In 1992 he signed for FC Luzern and with Luzern, Güntensperger achieved promotion from the second to the top tier, where he played for a further three seasons. In the summer 1996 he moved to FC Zürich and one year later to Eintracht Frankfurt in Germany. Two years later he returned to Switzerland and signed for Lausanne Sports.

Güntensperger joined FC Basel's first team during their 1998–99 season under head-coach Guy Mathez. He played his domestic league debut for the club in the home game in the Stadion Schützenmatte on 19 April 1999 as Basel played a 3–3 draw against St. Gallen. In the following season, Güntensperger played another few games for the club before retiring from professional football. During his short period with the club, Güntensperger played a total of nine games for Basel without scoring a goal. Six of these games were in the Nationalliga A, one in the Swiss Cup and two were friendly games.

Güntensperger then played for amateur clubs FC Tuggen, FC Horgen, Red Star Zürich and BSC Zürich.

Coaching career
Working as a player-coach. Güntensperger's first job was for FC Reinach (BL) and he commenced this engagement in the summer of 2003. For the 2006–07 season he moved to FC Bubendorf, however, in February 2007 he surprisingly resigned and the reasons remain unclear.

References

Sources
 Rotblau: Jahrbuch Saison 2017/2018. Publisher: FC Basel Marketing AG. 
 Die ersten 125 Jahre. Publisher: Josef Zindel im Friedrich Reinhardt Verlag, Basel. 
 Verein "Basler Fussballarchiv" Homepage

External links
 Urs Güntensperger at worldfootball.net 
 Urs Güntensperger at¹ eintracht-archiv.de 
 

1967 births
Living people
Swiss men's footballers
FC Winterthur players
FC Lugano players
BSC Young Boys players
FC Luzern players
FC Zürich players
Eintracht Frankfurt players
FC Lausanne-Sport players
FC Basel players
2. Bundesliga players
Expatriate footballers in Germany
Association football forwards